Alipur Chatta railway station is located in Alipur Chatha city, Gujranwala district, Punjab province, Pakistan.

See also
 List of railway stations in Pakistan
 Pakistan Railways

References

Railway stations in Gujranwala District
Railway stations on Khanewal–Wazirabad Line